Avery is a small unincorporated community in the northwest United States, located in the St. Joe River Valley in Shoshone County, Idaho. Avery is located in the middle of the St. Joe District of the Idaho Panhandle National Forest, and is a tourist attraction in the Idaho Panhandle known for its wilderness and outdoor recreation. It is upstream and east of St. Maries, the county seat of Benewah County.

Geography 
Avery is located at a latitude of 47.25 ºN, longitude 115.81 ºW, and an elevation of 2562 ft (781m) above sea level.

Climate
This climatic region is typified by large seasonal temperature differences, with warm to hot (and often humid) summers and cold (sometimes severely cold) winters.  According to the Köppen Climate Classification system, Avery has a humid continental climate, abbreviated "Dfb" on climate maps.

Demographics 
As of 2013, Avery had a population of 25 permanent residents. The temporary population is higher in the summer though due to seasonal workers for the United States Forest Service and the many summer homes in Avery and along the St. Joe River.. The small population is served by the Avery School District, also serving Calder, Idaho and Clarkia, Idaho.

History
The town was from the years 1909 to 1980 a division point on the Pacific Extension of the Chicago, Milwaukee, St. Paul and Pacific Railroad ("Milwaukee Road").  It was also once the western terminus for the easternmost of two electrified mountain sections on the route; the other ran in Washington from Othello, through the Cascade Range to the Puget Sound. Electric operations ran from 1914–74 on this section east to Harlowton, Montana.  Trains stopped at the Avery Depot, now listed on the National Register of Historic Places.  Here, steam or diesel locomotives were changed or hooked up to electric locomotives.

During the Great Fire of 1910, a 28-man firefighting team died near Setzer Creek outside of Avery.
The U.S. Army's 25th Infantry Regiment (known as the Buffalo Soldiers) helped build a back fire that saved Avery. During the fire, many found refuge in the newly-constructed railroad tunnels between Avery and the St. Paul Pass Tunnel (a.k.a. Taft Tunnel) to the northeast.

Avery's population was 450 in 1960.

With ongoing financial problems which worsened in the 1970s, the Milwaukee Road abandoned its right-of-way in the West in 1980, but the tunnels and grades east of Avery are now a rail trail route for hikers and bicyclists, the Route of the Hiawatha Trail.

Recreation 
Common activities include nature photography, camping, hunting, ATV riding, snowmobiling, hiking, horseback riding, mountain biking, fishing, and rafting.

Attractions 
The main attraction in Avery is the Fish Pond. All year long, tourists can purchase a handful of fish food for twenty-five cents and watch as the massive rainbow trout leap out of the water to get a bite to eat.

References

Unincorporated communities in Idaho
Unincorporated communities in Shoshone County, Idaho
Railway towns in Idaho